The Francis Light Memorial is a memorial about Francis Light in George Town, Penang, Malaysia. The memorial, located underneath the dome, reads: "In memory of Francis Light ESQ who first established this island as an English settlement and was many years governor. Born in the county of Suffolk in England and died October 21st, 1794. In his capacity as governor, the settlers and natives were greatly attached to him and by his death had to deplore the loss of one who watched over their interests and cares as father."

History
The memorial was built in 1886 to commemorate 100th anniversary of the founding of Penang by Captain Francis Light. However, it may be possible that the memorial was built in the 1840s or 1850s.

Architecture
The memorial was built with a mixture of Georgian architecture and Palladian architecture style with a dome in front of St. George's Church, located at Farquhar Street, George Town. The top of the dome is ornamented with vases and underneath the dome is a marble plaque honoring Light.

See also
 List of tourist attractions in Penang

References

Buildings and structures in Penang
1886 establishments in British Malaya